Barbara Liskov (born November 7, 1939 as Barbara Jane Huberman) is an American computer scientist who has made pioneering contributions to programming languages and distributed computing. Her notable work includes the development of the Liskov substitution principle which describes the fundamental nature of data abstraction, and is used in type theory (see subtyping) and in object-oriented programming (see inheritance). Her work was recognized with the 2008 Turing Award, the highest distinction in computer science.

Liskov is one of the earliest women to have been granted a doctorate in computer science in the United States, and the second woman to receive the Turing award. She is currently an Institute Professor and Ford Professor of Engineering at the Massachusetts Institute of Technology.

Early life and education
Liskov was born November 7, 1939, in Los Angeles, California, to a Jewish family, the eldest of Jane (née Dickhoff) and Moses Huberman's four children. She earned her bachelor's degree in mathematics with a minor in physics at the University of California, Berkeley in 1961. At Berkeley, she had only one other female classmate in her major. She applied to graduate mathematics programs at Berkeley and Princeton. At the time Princeton was not accepting female students in mathematics. She was accepted at Berkeley but instead moved to Boston and began working at Mitre Corporation, where she became interested in computers and programming. She worked at Mitre for one year before taking a programming job at Harvard working on language translation. 

She then decided to go back to school and applied again to Berkeley, but also to Stanford and Harvard. In March 1968 she became one of the first women in the United States to be awarded a Ph.D. from a computer science department when she was awarded her degree from Stanford University. At Stanford, she worked with John McCarthy and was supported to work in artificial intelligence. The topic of her Ph.D. thesis was a computer program to play chess endgames for which she developed the important killer heuristic.

Career
After graduating from Stanford, Liskov returned to Mitre to work as research staff.

Liskov has led many significant projects, including the Venus operating system, a small, low-cost timesharing system; the design and implementation of CLU; Argus, the first high-level language to support implementation of distributed programs and to demonstrate the technique of promise pipelining; and Thor, an object-oriented database system. With Jeannette Wing, she developed a particular definition of subtyping, commonly known as the Liskov substitution principle. She leads the Programming Methodology Group at MIT, with a current research focus in Byzantine fault tolerance and distributed computing. She was on the inaugural Engineering and Computer Science jury for the Infosys Prize in 2009.

Recognition and awards 
Liskov is a member of the National Academy of Engineering, the National Academy of Sciences and a fellow of the American Academy of Arts and Sciences and of the Association for Computing Machinery (ACM). In 2002, she was recognized as one of the top women faculty members at MIT, and among the top 50 faculty members in the sciences in the U.S. In 2002, Discover magazine recognized Liskov  as one of the 50 most important women in science.

In 2004, Barbara Liskov won the John von Neumann Medal for "fundamental contributions to programming languages, programming methodology, and distributed systems". On 19 November 2005, Barbara Liskov and Donald E. Knuth were awarded ETH Honorary Doctorates. Liskov and Knuth were also featured in the ETH Zurich Distinguished Colloquium Series. She was awarded a Doctorate Honoris Causa by the University of Lugano in 2011 and by Universidad Politécnica de Madrid in 2018.

Liskov received the 2008 Turing Award from the ACM in March 2009, for her work in the design of programming languages and software methodology that led to the development of object-oriented programming. Specifically, Liskov developed two programming languages, CLU in the 1970s and Argus in the 1980s. The ACM cited her contributions to the practical and theoretical foundations of "programming language and system design, especially related to data abstraction, fault tolerance, and distributed computing". In 2012 she was inducted into the National Inventors Hall of Fame.

Selected works 
Liskov is the author of five books as of February 2023 and over one hundred technical papers.

Books

Selected papers

Personal life 
In 1970, she married Nathan Liskov. They have one son, Moses, who earned a PhD in computer science from MIT in 2004 and teaches computer science at the College of William and Mary.

See also 

 List of pioneers in computer science
 Women in computing
 Timeline of women in science

References

External links 

 Prof. Liskov's home page
 Programming Methodology Group
 Turing Award press release
 Interview in Quanta magazine
 Tom Van Vleck, Barbara Liskov, A.M. Turing Award Winner
 National Public Radio "Science Friday" interview with Barbara Liskov, originally aired on 13 Mar 2009

 Celebrating Women of Distinction, Barbara Liskov, Turing Award interview by, Stephen Ibaraki

 John V. Guttag, Barbara Liskov, The Electron and The Bit: EECS at MIT, 1902–2002, Chapter VII: "Pioneering Women in EECS", pp. 225–239, 2003, Department of Electrical Engineering and Computer Science, MIT
 Barbara Liskov named Institute Professor, MIT News, July 1, 2008
 Department News: Barbara Liskov named Institute Professor , EECS Newsletter, Fall 2008
 Natasha Plotkin, Barbara Liskov named Institute Professor, The Tech (MIT), 128,29, July 9, 2008
 Robert Weisman, Top prize in computing goes to MIT professor, The Boston Globe, March 10, 2009
 Erica Naone, Driven to Abstraction, MIT Technology Review, December 21, 2009
 Barbara Liskov  at the Chess programming wiki

University of California, Berkeley alumni
Programming language designers
American women computer scientists
American computer scientists
1939 births
Living people
American women academics
Programming language researchers
Researchers in distributed computing
Fellows of the Association for Computing Machinery
Members of the United States National Academy of Engineering
Members of the United States National Academy of Sciences
Turing Award laureates
MIT School of Engineering faculty
Stanford University School of Engineering alumni
Jewish American scientists
Jewish women scientists
20th-century American engineers
21st-century American engineers
20th-century American women scientists
21st-century American women scientists
Women inventors